Cerambycini is a tribe of longhorn beetles classified under the subfamily Cerambycinae.

Description
Members of Cerambycini are generally large reddish-brown beetles with elongated bodies. The frons have pronounced furrows. The eyes are large, coarsely faceted, and deeply curving inwards. The antennae are generally long, with the segments closest to the body exhibiting thickening at their apical ends. The pronotum is ridged across or diagonally, usually with spines or other sharp projections at the sides. The elytra are thinly covered in hair and are rectangular or slightly tapering. The claws are prominent.

Distribution
Members of Cerambycini are abundant in tropical regions and are more or less cosmopolitan in distribution.

Genera
The following genera are classified within the tribe Cerambycini:

 Aeolesthes Gahan, 1890
 Allodissus Schwarzer, 1926
 Amphelictus Bates, 1884
 Archaeopalus Vitali, Gouverneur & Chemin, 2017
 Atiaia Martins & Monné, 2002 
 Bolbotritus Bates, 1871
 Bothrocerambyx Schwarzer, 1929
 Bulbocerambyx Lazarev, 2019
 Butherium Bates, 1870
 Calocerambyx Heller, 1905
 Calpazia Pascoe, 1857
 Carinolesthes Vitali, Gouverneur & Chemin, 2017
 Cerambyx (Linnaeus, 1758) 
 Cevaeria Tavakilian, 2003 
 Coelodon Audinet-Serville, 1832
 Coelodoniella Adlbauer, 2005
 Coleoxestia Aurivillius, 1912 
 Criodion Audinet-Serville, 1833 
 Cyriopalus Pascoe, 1866
 Derolus Gahan, 1891
 Derolydnus Hüdepohl, 1989
 Dialeges Pascoe, 1856
 Diorthus Gahan, 1891
 Dissaporus Aurivillius, 1907
 Dissopachys Reitter, 1886
 Djabiria Duvivier, 1891
 Dymasius Thomson, 1864
 Elydnus Pascoe, 1869
 Falsopachydissus Miroshnikov, 2017
 Gibbocerambyx Pic, 1923
 Graciliderolus Lepesme & Breuning, 1958
 Hamaticherus Audinet-Serville, 1834  
 Hemadius Fairmaire, 1889
 Hirtobrasilianus Fragoso & Tavakilian, 1958  
 Hoplocerambyx Thomson, 1864
 Imbrius Pascoe, 1866
 Ischionorox Aurivillius, 1922  
 Iuati Martins & Galileo, 2010 
 Jebusaea Reiche, 1877
 Juiaparus Martins & Monné, 2002 
 Jupoata Martins & Monné, 2002  
 Lachnopterus Thomson, 1864
 Lamellocerambyx Pic, 1923
 Laomargites Pic, 1923
 Lateropalus Vitali, Gouverneur & Chemin, 2017
 Macrambyx Fragoso, 1982  
 Margites Gahan, 1891
 Massirachys Vitali, Gouverneur & Chemin, 2017
 Melathemma Bates, 1870
 Metacriodion Fragoso, 1970 
 Micrambyx Kolbe, 1893
 Microderolus Aurivillius, 1925
 Microdymasius Pic, 1946
 Mimimbrius Miroshnikov, 2017
 Nadezhdiella Plavilstshikov, 1931
 Neocerambyx Thomson, 1860
 Neoplocaederus Sama, 1991
 Ochrodion Fragoso, 1982  
 Odzala Villiers, 1968
 Omodiastus Haller & Jacquot, 2019
 Pachydissus Newman, 1838
 Paracriodion Fragoso, 1982 
 Parasphallenum Fragoso, 1982  
 Paratiaia Dalens & Guiglaris, 2012
 Parolesthes Vitali, Gouverneur & Chemin, 2017
 Pascoetrephus Miroshnikov, 2017
 Peruanus Tippmann, 1960 
 Plavichydissus Pic, 1946
 Plocaederus Megerle in Dejean, 1835 
 Pneumida J. Thomson, 1864
 Poeciloxestia Lane, 1965  
 Potiaxixa Martins & Monné, 2002 
 Prosphilus Thomson, 1864
 Pseudaeolesthes Plavilstshikov, 1931
 Pseudopachydissus Pic, 1933
 Ptycholaemus Chevrolat, 1858
 Rhytidodera White, 1853
 Sebasmia Pascoe, 1859
 Sinopachys Sama, 1999
 Sphallambyx Fragoso, 1982 
 Sphallenopsis Fragoso, 1981 
 Sphallenum Bates, 1870 
 Sphallopterus Fragoso, 1982 
 Sphallotrichus Fragoso, 1982 
 Spiniderolus Lepesme & Breuning, 1958
 Spinidymasius Miroshnikov, 2017
 Striatoptycholaemus Lepesme & Breuning, 1956
 Sudreana Adlbauer, 2006
 Tapinolachnus Thomson, 1864
 Taurotagus Lacordaire, 1869
 Teraschema Thomson, 1860
 Trachylophus Gahan, 1888
 Trirachys Hope, 1841
 Utopia (insect) J. Thomson, 1864
 Xenopachys Sama, 1999
 Xestiodion Fragoso, 1981
 Xoanodera Pascoe, 1857
 Xoanotrephus Hüdepohl, 1989
 Zatrephus Pascoe, 1857
 Zegriades Pascoe, 1869

References

External links

 
Polyphaga tribes